The Andrea Doria class (usually called Duilio class in Italian sources) was a pair of dreadnought battleships built for the Royal Italian Navy (Regia Marina) between 1912 and 1916. The two ships—Andrea Doria and Duilio—were completed during World War I. The class was an incremental improvement over the preceding . Like the earlier ships, Andrea Doria and Duilio were armed with a main battery of thirteen  guns.

The two ships were based in southern Italy during World War I to help ensure that the Austro-Hungarian Navy's surface fleet would be contained in the Adriatic. Neither vessel saw any combat during the conflict. After the war, they cruised the Mediterranean and were involved in several international incidents, including at Corfu in 1923. In 1933, both ships were placed in reserve. In 1937 the ships began a lengthy reconstruction. The reconstruction work lasted until 1940, by which time Italy was already engaged in World War II.

The two ships were moored in Taranto on the night of 11/12 November 1940 when the British launched a carrier strike on the Italian fleet. In the resulting Battle of Taranto, Duilio was hit by a torpedo and forced to beach to avoid sinking. Andrea Doria was undamaged in the raid; repairs for Duilio lasted until May 1941. Both ships escorted convoys to North Africa in late 1941, including Operation M42, where Andrea Doria saw action at the inconclusive First Battle of Sirte on 17 December. Fuel shortages curtailed further activities in 1942 and 1943, and both ships were interned at Malta following Italy's surrender in September 1943. Italy was permitted to retain both battleships after the war, and they alternated as fleet flagship until the early 1950s, when they were removed from active service. Both ships were scrapped after 1956.

Design and description

The Andrea Doria-class ships were designed by naval architect Vice Admiral (Generale del Genio navale) Giuseppe Valsecchi and were ordered in response to French plans to build the s. The design of the preceding s was generally satisfactory and was adopted with some minor changes. These mostly concerned the reduction of the superstructure by shortening the forecastle deck, the consequent lowering of the amidships gun turret and the upgrading of the secondary armament to sixteen  guns in lieu of the eighteen  guns of the older ships.

General characteristics
They were provided with a complete double bottom and their hulls were subdivided by 23 longitudinal and transverse bulkheads. The ships had two rudders, both on the centerline. They had a crew of 31 officers and 969 enlisted men.

Propulsion
The ships were fitted with three Parsons steam turbine sets, arranged in three engine rooms. The center engine room housed one set of turbines that drove the two inner propeller shafts. It was flanked by compartments on either side, each housing one turbine set powering the outer shafts. Steam for the turbines was provided by 20 Yarrow boilers, 8 of which burned oil and 12 of which burned coal sprayed with oil.

Armament
As built, the ships' main armament comprised thirteen 46-caliber 305-millimeter guns, designed by Armstrong Whitworth and Vickers, in five gun turrets. The turrets were all on the centerline, with a twin-gun turret superfiring over a triple-gun turret in fore and aft pairs, and a third triple turret amidships, designated 'A', 'B', 'Q', 'X', and 'Y' from front to rear. The turrets had an elevation capability of −5 to +20 degrees and the ships could carry 88 rounds for each gun.

The secondary armament on the two ships consisted of sixteen 45-caliber  guns, also designed by Armstrong Whitworth, mounted in casemates on the sides of the hull underneath the main guns. Their positions tended to be wet in heavy seas, especially the rear guns. These guns could depress to −5 degrees and had a maximum elevation of +20 degrees; they had a rate of fire of six shots per minute. The ships carried 3,440 rounds for them. For defense against torpedo boats, the ships carried nineteen 50-caliber  guns; they could be mounted in 39 different positions, including on the turret roofs and upper decks. These guns had the same range of elevation as the secondary guns, and their rate of fire was higher at 10 rounds per minute. The ships were also fitted with three submerged  torpedo tubes, one on each broadside and the third in the stern.

Armor
The Andrea Doria-class ships had a complete waterline armor belt with a maximum thickness of  that reduced to  towards the stern and  towards the bow. Above this strake was a thinner one, 130 millimeters thick, that protected the casemates. Fore and aft transverse bulkheads connected the belt to the decks.

Modifications and reconstruction

During World War I, a pair of 50-caliber 76-millimeter guns on high-angle mounts were fitted as anti-aircraft (AA) guns, one gun at the bow and the other on top of 'X' turret. In 1925 the number of low-angle 50-caliber 76-millimeter guns was reduced to 13, all mounted on the turret tops, and six new 40-caliber 76-millimeter guns were installed abreast the aft funnel. Two license-built 2-pounder AA guns were also fitted. In 1926 the rangefinders were upgraded and a fixed aircraft catapult was mounted on the port side of the forecastle for a Macchi M.18 seaplane.

By the early 1930s, the Regia Marina had begun design work on the new s, but it recognized that they would not be complete for some time. As a stop-gap measure in response to the new French s, the navy decided to modernize its old battleships; work on the two surviving Conte di Cavours began in 1933 and the two Andrea Dorias followed in 1937. The work lasted until July 1940 for Duilio and October 1940 for Andrea Doria. The ships' crews increased to 70 officers and 1,450 enlisted men.

The boilers were replaced by eight superheated Yarrow boilers.

The center turret and the torpedo tubes were removed and all of the existing secondary armament and AA guns were replaced by a dozen  guns in four triple-gun turrets and ten  AA guns in single turrets. In addition the ships were fitted with fifteen 54-caliber Breda  light AA guns in six twin-gun and three single mounts and sixteen  Breda Model 35 AA guns, also in twin mounts. The 305-millimeter guns were bored out to 320 millimeters (12.6 in) and their turrets were modified to use electric power. They had a fixed loading angle of +12 degrees, but there is uncertainty on their new maximum elevation, with some sources citing a maximum value of +27 degrees, while others claim one of +30 degrees. In early 1942 the rearmost 20-millimeter mounts were replaced by twin 37-millimeter gun mounts and the 20-millimeter guns were moved to the roof of Turret 'B', while the RPC motors from the stabilized mounts of the 90 mm guns were removed. Atop the conning tower there was a fire-control director fitted with three large rangefinders.

The existing underwater protection was replaced by the Pugliese system that consisted of a large cylinder surrounded by fuel oil or water that was intended to absorb the blast of a torpedo warhead.

In addition, the cost of the reconstruction would be not much less than the cost of building a brand new Littorio-class battleship; moreover, the reconstruction work caused bottlenecks in the providing of steel plates, that caused substantial delays in the construction of the modern battleships, which otherwise might have been completed at an earlier date.

Ships

Service history

Both battleships were completed after Italy entered World War I on the side of the Triple Entente, though neither saw action, since Italy's principal naval opponent, the Austro-Hungarian Navy, largely remained in port for the duration of the war. Admiral Paolo Thaon di Revel, the Italian naval chief of staff, believed that Austro-Hungarian submarines and minelayers could operate effectively in the narrow waters of the Adriatic. The threat from these underwater weapons to his capital ships was too serious for him to use the fleet in an active way. Instead, Revel decided to implement a blockade at the relatively safer southern end of the Adriatic with the battle fleet, while smaller vessels, such as the MAS torpedo boats, conducted raids on Austro-Hungarian ships and installations. Meanwhile, Revel's battleships would be preserved to confront the Austro-Hungarian battle fleet in the event that it sought a decisive engagement.

Andrea Doria and Duilio both cruised in the eastern Mediterranean after the war, and both were involved in postwar disputes over control of various cities. Duilio was sent to provide a show of force during a dispute over control of İzmir in April 1919 and Andrea Doria assisted in the suppression of Gabriele D'Annunzio's seizure of Fiume in November 1920. Duilio cruised the Black Sea after the İzmir affair until she was replaced in 1920 by the battleship Giulio Cesare. Andrea Doria and Duilio were present during the Corfu incident in 1923. In January 1925, Andrea Doria visited Lisbon, Portugal, to represent Italy during the celebration marking the 400th anniversary of the death of explorer Vasco da Gama. The two ships performed the normal routine of peacetime cruises and goodwill visits throughout the 1920s and early 1930s; both were placed in reserve in 1933.

Both Andrea Doria and Duilio went into drydock in the late 1930s for extensive modernizations; this work lasted until October and April 1940, respectively. By that time, Italy had entered World War II on the side of the Axis powers. The two ships joined the 5th Division based at Taranto. Duilio participated in a patrol intended to catch the British battleship  and a convoy bound for Malta, but neither target was found. She and Andrea Doria were present during the British attack on Taranto on the night of 11/12 November 1940. Andrea Doria was undamaged in the raid, but Duilio was hit by a torpedo on her starboard side. She was grounded to prevent her from sinking in the harbor and temporary repairs were effected to allow her to travel to Genoa for permanent repairs, which began in January 1941. In February, she was attacked by the British Force H; several warships attempted to shell Duilio while she was in dock, but they scored no hits. Repair work lasted until May 1941, when she rejoined the fleet at Taranto.

In the meantime, Andrea Doria participated in several operations intended to catch British convoys in the Mediterranean, including the Operation Excess convoys in January 1941. By the end of the year, both battleships were tasked with escorting convoys from Italy to North Africa to support the Italian and German forces fighting there. These convoys included Operation M41 on 13 December and Operation M42 on 17–19 December. During the latter, Andrea Doria and Giulio Cesare engaged British cruisers and destroyers in the First Battle of Sirte on the first day of the operation. The Italian battleships main guns near-missed and damaged the British destroyer HMS Kipling. Neither the Italians nor the British pressed their attacks and the battle ended inconclusively. Duilio was assigned to distant support for the operation, and was too far away to actively participate in the battle. Convoy escort work continued into early 1942, but thereafter the fleet began to suffer from a severe shortage of fuel, which kept the ships in port for the next two years. Duilio sailed away from Taranto on 14 February with a pair of light cruisers and seven destroyers in order to intercept the British convoy MW 9, bounded from Alexandria to Malta, but the force could not locate the British ships, and so returned to port. After learning of Duilio departure, however, British escorts scuttled the transport Rowallan Castle, previously disabled by German aircraft.

Both ships were interned at Malta following Italy's surrender on 3 September 1943. They remained there until 1944, when the Allies allowed them to return to Italian ports; Andrea Doria went to Syracuse, Sicily, and Duilio returned to Taranto before joining her sister at Syracuse. Italy was allowed to retain the two ships after the end of the war, and they alternated in the role of fleet flagship until 1953, when they were both removed from service. Andrea Doria carried on as a gunnery training ship, but Duilio was placed in reserve. Both battleships were stricken from the naval register in September 1956 and were subsequently broken up for scrap.

Notes

Footnotes

References

Further reading

External links

 Andrea Doria (1913) Marina Militare website

Battleship classes